Velutinoidea is a superfamily of sea snails, marine gastropod molluscs  in the clade Littorinimorpha.

Taxonomy
Family Velutinidae Gray, 1840
Subfamily Velutininae Gray, 1840
Subfamily Lamellariinae d’Orbigny, 1841
Family Triviidae Troschel, 1863
Subfamily Eratoinae Gill, 1871
Subfamily Triviinae Troschel, 1863

This classification follows the study by Ponder & Warén, published in 1988. However, there were some adaptations for the family Triviidae, based on the study by Schilder, published in 1966.

References

Littorinimorpha
Taxa named by John Edward Gray